Alan Medina Camacho (born 19 August 1997) is a Mexican professional footballer who plays as a winger for Liga MX club Juárez, on loan from América.

Club career
On 1 January 2021, Medina signed for Liga MX club América.

International career
In May 2019, Medina was called up by Jaime Lozano to participate in that year's Toulon Tournament, where Mexico finished third in the tournament.

Career statistics

Club

References

External links
Alan Medina at Soccerway
Alan Medina at Football Database EU

1997 births
Living people
Mexican footballers
Association football forwards
Deportivo Toluca F.C. players
Club América footballers
Footballers from Sinaloa
Sportspeople from Culiacán
Liga MX players